Budjak is a geographic and historical region in Ukraine and Moldova, also referred to as many other names.

Budjak, Budzhak, Budzhakh, Bugeac or Bucaq may also refer to: 

 , a Turkic ethnic group that inhabited Budjak
 Budjak Horde, a former autonomous formation of Budjak Tatars under the influence of the Ottoman Empire
 Bucaq (also Budzhakh), a village in Azerbaijan
 Yuxarı Buçaq (also Budzhak), a village in Azerbaijan
 Bugeac, Gagauzia, a village in Moldova
 Bugeac Steppe, a steppe in Moldova and Ukraine
 Lake Bugeac, a lake in Romania

See also
 Bucak (disambiguation)
 Bucaq, Yevlakh (disambiguation)
 Bujak (disambiguation)
 Sibat, a Filipino spear, also known as budjak, bodjak and budiak among Muslim Filipinos